Melittia congoana is a moth of the family Sesiidae. It is known from the Democratic Republic of the Congo.

References

Sesiidae
Moths described in 1916